R. palmarum may refer to:
 Rattus palmarum, the palm rat, a rodent species found only in India
 Rhynchophorus palmarum, the South American palm weevil, a beetle species